Albert Leong (born September 30, 1952), also known as Al "Ka Bong" Leong, is an American stuntman and actor. Characterized by his martial arts skills (including Northern Shaolin Kung Fu, Tae Kwon Do, Kali, and Jujutsu), long wavy hair, and a prominent Fu Manchu moustache, he has had a number of small but memorable roles as a henchman in many popular action films, including Lethal Weapon and Die Hard. He is also notable for his role as Genghis Khan in Bill & Ted's Excellent Adventure.

He collaborated with director John Carpenter in Big Trouble in Little China and They Live. Such appearances have garnered him a cult following.

Early life
Leong was born in St. Louis, Missouri. The youngest of three children born to Chinese American parents, he grew up behind the Chinese laundry that they owned. In 1962, when he was ten years old, they moved to Los Angeles. Leong attended Hollywood High School.

Leong had brain cancer in 1993 and suffered a stroke in 2005.

Career
His credits include Lethal Weapon, Die Hard, Joshua Tree, Big Trouble in Little China, The Scorpion King, and They Live. and a recurring role on the first season of the TV series 24. He also portrayed an out-of-time Genghis Khan in the comedy Bill & Ted's Excellent Adventure. In 2003, Leong lampooned himself as well as the Hollywood tradition of actor and director 'reels' by starring in screenwriter David Callaham's "Writer's Reel." In the five-minute short film, Leong portrayed Callaham going through a typical day in the life of a writer. The 'reel' was accepted into a number of short film festivals.

As a stuntman, Leong was involved with the production of numerous films including The Golden Child, Last Action Hero, Roland Emmerich's Godzilla, Tim Burton's Planet of the Apes, and Daredevil. He also has made appearances on several television shows such as Knight Rider, Magnum, P.I., The Twilight Zone, T. J. Hooker, MacGyver, That '70s Show, and HBO's Deadwood. He wrote and directed the low-budget film Daddy Tell Me a Story....

Filmography

Television

Music videos
 2003 Poppin' Them Thangs by G-Unit

Further reading 

 Leong, Al (August 1, 2011). The Eight Lives of Al Ka-Bong Leong. Al Leong. .

References

External links

Al Leong: Cinematic Legend 

1952 births
Living people
American male film actors
American male television actors
American male actors of Chinese descent
American stunt performers
American male karateka
American wushu practitioners
American male taekwondo practitioners
American jujutsuka
American practitioners of Brazilian jiu-jitsu
Hollywood High School alumni